Robinson is a city in McLennan County, Texas, United States. The population was 12,443 at the 2020 census. It is part of the Waco Metropolitan Statistical Area.

Geography

Robinson is located at  (31.470518, –97.119361).

Demographics

As of the 2020 United States census, there were 12,443 people, 3,868 households, and 3,297 families residing in the city.

As of the census of 2000,  7,845 people, 2,828 households, and 2,330 families resided in the city, while the primary Robinson zip code 76706 (which includes students at Baylor University) was 29,449. The population density was 248.6 people per square mile (96.0/km). There were 2,942 housing units at an average density of 93.2 per square mile (36.0/km). The racial makeup of the city was 91.75% White, 2.09% African American, 0.38% Native American, 0.48% Asian, 0.01% Pacific Islander, 4.27% from other races, and 1.01% from two or more races. Hispanics or Latinos of any race were 9.00% of the population.

Of the 2,828 households, 37.3% had children under the age of 18 living with them, 70.2% were married couples living together, 9.6% had a female householder with no husband present, and 17.6% were not families. About 15.4% of all households were made up of individuals, and 8.2% had someone living alone who was 65 years of age or older. The average household size was 2.77 and the average family size was 3.07.

In the city, the population was distributed as 26.5% under the age of 18, 6.7% from 18 to 24, 26.6% from 25 to 44, 25.9% from 45 to 64, and 14.4% who were 65 years of age or older. The median age was 39 years. For every 100 females, there were 94.0 males. For every 100 females age 18 and over, there were 91.1 males.

The median income for a household in the city was $49,404, and for a family was $51,953. Males had a median income of $35,718 versus $23,623 for females. The per capita income for the city was $21,680. About 3.6% of families and 4.4% of the population were below the poverty line, including 4.0% of those under age 18 and 6.6% of those age 65 or over.

Education
Robinson is served by the Robinson Independent School District, Waco Independent School District, and Midway Independent School District

Notable people

 Jason Tucker, who played for the Dallas Cowboys, grew up in Robinson and graduated from Robinson High School

References

External links
 The Greater Robinson Chamber of Commerce

Cities in McLennan County, Texas
Cities in Texas